Ernakulam Sir M. Visvesvaraya Terminal Superfast Express is a Superfast train belonging to Southern Railway zone of Indian Railways  that runs between  and Sir M. Visvesvaraya Terminal in India.

Currently, there are two sets of Ernakulam–Sir M. Visvesvaraya Terminal Superfast Express which is 1st set consists of train number 12683 / 12684 and the second set consists of train number 22607 / 22608. Recently a decision to combine both the Banaswadi expresses and to run it as triweekly between Ernakulam Junction and Banaswadi was taken via Krishnarajapuram.The train now originates from  Sri M Visvesvaraya Terminal,Bengaluru.

Service
The frequency of the first set is bi-weekly and the frequency of the second set is weekly and the distance of both trains are the same with the length of 604 km and the average speed are also the same with 55 km/hr with the maximum time of 11 hours 3 mins on both sides.

Routes

Traction
As the route is fully electrified a WAP-4 of Erode Loco Shed pulls the train on both sides.

External links
 12683 Ernakulam - Banaswadi (Bengaluru) Express India Rail Info
 12684 Ernakulam - Banaswadi (Bengaluru) Express India Rail Info
 22607 Ernakulam - Banaswadi (Bengaluru) Express India Rail Info
 22608 Ernakulam - Banaswadi (Bengaluru) Express India Rail Info

References

Express trains in India
Transport in Kochi
Transport in Bangalore
Rail transport in Kerala
Rail transport in Tamil Nadu
Rail transport in Karnataka